Río Mayo is a town located in the Río Senguer Department, in southwest Chubut Province, Argentina. It is an obligatory stopover of the Central Corridor towards Chile, close to two border crossings, one through the town of Lago Blanco to Balmaceda, Chile, and the other through Aldea Beleiro. 

Río Mayo has the essential services for the visitor and also allows the practice of activities such as sport fishing, horseback riding, mountain biking and hiking.

Climate
The Chubut town of Río Mayo has a harsh and rigorous climate for most of the year (the first frosts occur in March and April), characterized by prolonged cold and extremely hostile winters with an absolute minimum temperature of -27º C and freezing maximum temperatures, negative down to -21º C.

References

External links

 Municipality of Río Mayo

Populated places in Chubut Province
Municipalities of Argentina